Blue is a given name, nickname, and surname. It may refer to:

People with the surname 

Alfred Blue (born 1991), American football player
Barry Blue (born 1950), British singer, popular in the 1970s
Ben Blue (1901–1975), Canadian actor and comedian
Billy Blue (c.1767–1834), Australian convict
Bob Blue (1948–2006), American singer-songwriter
Callum Blue (born 1977), English actor
Chris Blue (born 1990), American R&B singer
Dan Blue (born 1949), American politician
David Blue (actor) (born 1982), American actor, writer, producer and director
David Blue (musician) (1941–1982), American singer-songwriter
John Blue (disambiguation), multiple people
Jonas Blue (born 1989), British DJ, songwriter, and record producer 
Josh Blue (born 1978), American comedian
Linden Blue (born 1936), American businessman
Lionel Blue (1930-2016), British rabbi and broadcaster
Lu Blue (1897–1958), American baseball player
Mick Blue (born 1976), Austrian pornographic actor
Mikal Blue (born 1966), British record producer and songwriter 
Neal Blue (born 1935), American businessman
Rick Blue (born 1946), Canadian comedian and musician
Richard W. Blue (1841–1907), American politician
Robert Blue (1946–1989), American pin-up artist
Robert D. Blue (1898–1989), American politician
Rupert Blue (1868–1948) American physician and Surgeon General
Skye Blue (born 1961), American pornographic actress
Vander Blue (born 1992), American basketball player
Vida Blue (born 1949), American baseball player
Violet Blue, American writer and sex columnist
William Thornton Blue (1902–1968), American jazz clarinetist

People with the given name 

Blue Leach (born 1967), music video TV director
Blue Balliett (born 1955), American author
Blue Barron (1913–2005), American orchestra leader born Harry Freidman
Blue Ivy Carter (born 2012), child of American musical artists Beyoncé and Jay Z

People with the nickname or stage name 

Blue Adams (born 1979), American football player
Blue Dixon (c. 1885–c. 1941), Australian rugby union player
Blue Edwards (born 1965), American basketball player
Melvin Franklin (1942–1995), American singer
Sandra Good (born 1944), associate of American criminal Charles Manson
Blue Howell (fl. 1930s), American football player and coach
Blue Mitchell (1930–1979), American trumpeter
Blue Weaver (born 1947), Welsh keyboardist, session musician, songwriter and record producer

Fictional characters with the name or nickname 
Joseph "Blue" Pulaski, a character in the 2003 American movie Old School.
Blue Coulson, a character in the Black Mirror episode Hated in the Nation.

See also 

 
 
 Blue (disambiguation)

Lists of people by nickname

de:Blue (Familienname)